Trachydoras microstomus is a species of thorny catfish that is native to Bolivia, Brazil, Colombia, Guyana, Peru and Venezuela.  It occurs in the Essequibo, Orinoco and Amazon basins.  This species grows to a length of  SL.

References 
 

Doradidae
Freshwater fish of Brazil
Fish of Bolivia
Freshwater fish of Colombia
Fish of Guyana
Freshwater fish of Peru
Fish of Venezuela
Fish described in 1912
Taxa named by Carl H. Eigenmann